Sursoptok Underpass is a pedestrian underpass located in Bangladesh. It is one of the four underpasses in Dhaka. The underpass with 15 meter high, 135 meters long, 5 meters, four 42 meter long tunnels is currently the largest underpass in Bangladesh. Prior to its construction, Gulistan underpass was the largest underpass in the country.

Location
The underpass is located near Kurmitola General Hospital and Radisson Hotel at the MES square of Airport road, adjacent to Shaheed Ramiz Uddin Cantonment College in Dhaka.

Background
The safe road movement started in 2018 after a road accident took the lives of two students in the underpass area. The government ordered the construction of underpass under the accident prone road per the demands raised by the protesters. the Inauguration of the underpass's construction happened in August 14 days after the accident. Although the protesters requested that the underpass be named after the dead students, it was named Sursoptok in honor of the seven heroes. The underpass, delayed due to the corona outbreak, was inaugurated four years after construction began.

Description
Box pushing technology was used in the underpass's construction by the 24 Engineer Brigade of Bangladesh Army. The construction cost for the underpass was Taka 57 crore, and it has a museum.

Notes

References

Subway (underpass)
Dhaka
Buildings and structures in Dhaka
2022 establishments in Bangladesh
Tunnels in Bangladesh